This is a list of members of the Tasmanian House of Assembly, elected at the 2002 state election:

 Labor MHA for Denison, Jim Bacon, resigned on 23 February 2004. David Bartlett was elected as his replacement on 1 April 2004.
 Labor MHA for Lyons, Ken Bacon, resigned on 29 April 2005. Heather Butler was elected as his replacement on 10 May 2004.

Distribution of seats

See also
List of past members of the Tasmanian House of Assembly

Members of Tasmanian parliaments by term
21st-century Australian politicians